

National flag

Governmental flags

Military flags

Naval flags

Rank flags

Local flags

Flags of municipalities

Historical local flags

Historical flags

Political flags

House Flags

See also 

 Flag of Cuba
 Coat of arms of Cuba

References 

Lists and galleries of flags
Flags